Float is the sixth studio album by American rapper Styles P. The album was released on April 16, 2013, by Nature Sounds and High Times Records. The album was produced entirely by fellow New Yorker, American record producer Scram Jones. The album also features guest appearances from fellow American rappers N.O.R.E., Sheek Louch, Jadakiss, Raekwon, Bullpen and Scram Jones.

Background 
On February 25, 2013, Styles P announced he would be releasing Float an album entirely produced by Scram Jones on April 20, 2013. The release date was later pushed up to April 16, 2013. On March 5, 2013, the first single "Hater Love" featuring Sheek Louch was released for digital download. On April 4, 2013, the music video was released for "Hater Love" featuring Sheek Louch. On April 8, 2013, the song "Red Eye" featuring Jadakiss was released. On April 20, 2013, the music video was released for "I Need Weed". On May 14, 2013, the music video was released for "Red Eye" featuring Jadakiss.

In a May 2014, interview with XXL, Styles P spoke about the album, saying: "Float was really just a fast project, man. I remember that Sheek was away and Kiss was away, and my engineer Cruz was away. Scram is my homie, I fuck with him, so I needed a studio I could work out of. He live a town away from me, about 15 or 20 minutes, so I would just hop in the ride, go to his place, smoke out, throw a beat on and the joint was done. One day I think we did four or five joints. Whenever I got there, we did joints. I got a lot of love for Scram. He's an authentic beatmaker and producer. I love Scram, Statik, Alchemist, [Dame] Greese, Vinny Idol—those dudes make the sound I fuck with. [Float] didn't start as a project. We just had so much so fast that we thought, "Well, we might as well do something." So we did."

Critical response 

Float was met with generally positive reviews from music critics. David Jeffries of Allmusic gave the album three and a half stars out of five saying, "That's a lot of highlights and some sure choices for the next hits collection, but Float is still short, clocking in at less than 40 minutes, and Scram Jones decides to keep it underground, meaning your crossover Styles won't be found here. If you think of it as a conceptual street release made for Styles and/or Scram Jones fans and Float succeeds splendidly." Ronald Grant of HipHopDX gave the album three and a half stars out of five, saying "With Float, Styles P shows that he's not afraid to step outside of his gritty NYC lyrical gangster boundaries and be a bit more lighthearted. Though not his greatest body of work, it places his cunning lyrical skills front and center while showcasing his and Scram Jones' identical ears for quality, bass-heavy production and the fact that gangsters want to have a little fun, too." Nick De Molina of XXL gave the album an L, saying "Clocking in at less than 45 quotable-stuffed minutes, Float is short and sweet, a quick reminder that The Phantom hasn't lost a step lyrically. All in all, the project is a welcome addition to the D-Block rapper's catalogue, though its narrow vision holds the album back from reaching any great heights. If anything, it's assurance to longtime fans that Styles P isn't going anywhere anytime soon, nor should he."

Peter Marrack of Exclaim! gave the album a six out of ten, saying "Float (the Yonkers, NY rapper's sixth studio album) explores new sonic territory, rooted in gangster rap, but branching into more experimental electronic production. Jones (who made a name for himself producing for NYC's hardest: Wu-Tang, Immortal Technique, Lloyd Banks) starts bare bones with a sample and then extends the sound outward, filling the body of the track with drums. The result isn't groundbreaking, but it's still fresh for Styles." Grant Jones of RapReviews gave the album a 4.5 out of 10, saying "What sets Float back the most is Styles P himself, with raps that are predictably hardcore, but devoid of any intelligence or irony. The cursed 'seriousitosis' is evident more than ever, which Styles has always flirted with but usually spices up his verses with a threat or claim of superiority that is so ridiculous that it becomes tongue-in-cheek. It's the reason he has always been my favourite LOX member, the fact he is SO hardcore that his lifestyle is probably impossible."

Commercial performance 
Float debuted at number 124 on the Billboard 200 selling 3,900 copies in its first week of release.

Track listing 
All songs produced by Scram Jones.

Release history

Charts

References 

2013 albums
Styles P albums
Albums produced by Scram Jones
Nature Sounds albums